The Page and Son Apartments is a tenement building located in Portland, Oregon designed by prominent architect John Virginius Bennes. The structure is listed on the National Register for Historic Places.

See also
 National Register of Historic Places listings in Northeast Portland, Oregon

References
 

Apartment buildings on the National Register of Historic Places in Portland, Oregon
Kerns, Portland, Oregon